Hymenoxys quinquesquamata is a North American species of flowering plant in the family Asteraceae known by the common names rincon rubberweed or rincon bitterweed. It has been found only in the states of Arizona and New Mexico in the southwestern United States. Many of the populations lie in the Huachuca Mountains of Cochise County in Arizona.

One plant can produce sometimes as many as 50 flower heads in a branching array. Each head has 5–8 yellow ray flowers and 30–100 tiny yellow disc flowers.

References

External links

quiquesquamata
Flora of Arizona
Flora of New Mexico
Plants described in 1915